Goran Rušinović is a Croatian film director and screenwriter. 

After graduating from the Zagreb Academy of Fine Arts Rušinović went on to enrol at the European Film College in Ebeltoft, Denmark in 1993, where he directed his first short film titled Kilo of Shrimp. In 1996 he went on to the New York Film Academy where he made another short film titled Get the Hard Goods.

His first feature film was the independently produced Mondo Bobo (1997), which won four Golden Arena awards at the 1997 Pula Film Festival, the Croatian national film awards, including the Golden Arena for Best Director.

His next film was the largely unnoticed The World's Greatest Monster (2003), but his 2008 film Buick Riviera, based on a novel by Miljenko Jergović, won him the Golden Arena for Best Screenplay at the 2008 Pula Film Festival, as well as the main award in the regional competition at the 2009 Motovun Film Festival, and the Best Film award at the 2008 Sarajevo Film Festival.

Filmography
Mondo Bobo (1997)
The World's Greatest Monster (Svjetsko čudovište, 2003)
Buick Riviera (2008)

References

External links

Goran Rušinović at Filmski-programi.hr 
Goran Rušinović at Film.hr 

1969 births
Living people
Film people from Zagreb
Croatian film directors
Croatian screenwriters
Golden Arena for Best Director winners
Academy of Fine Arts, University of Zagreb alumni
New York Film Academy alumni
Croatian expatriates in the United States